Neppach may refer to
 Nelly Neppach (1898–1933), German tennis player
 Robert Neppach (1890–1938), Austrian film architect and producer